This article contains a list of the most studied restriction enzymes whose names start with Bsp to Bss inclusive.  It contains approximately 180 enzymes.

The following information is given:



Whole list navigation

Restriction enzymes

Bsp

Bsr - Bss

Notes

Biotechnology
Restriction enzyme cutting sites
Restriction enzymes